Luleå Hockeyförening is an ice hockey club from Luleå, Sweden. The club has been playing in the Swedish Hockey League (SHL), the top tier of ice hockey in Sweden, since the 1984–85 season. They are the northernmost team in the league and have won the Swedish championships once, in 1996. Since being promoted to the top flight (then called Elitserien) in 1984, the team has not once had to participate in a promotion/relegation-qualifier to defend their spot in the top league.

Season-by-season record
This list features the five most recent seasons. For a more complete list, see List of Luleå HF seasons.

Players and personnel

Current roster

Updated 24 February 2023

Team captains

 Thorbjörn Köhler, 1979–84
 Lars Lindgren, 1984–88
 Lars-Gunnar Pettersson, 1988–92
 Stefan Nilsson, 1992–99
 Roger Åkerström, 1999–2005
 Mikael Renberg, 2005–07
 Anders Burström, 2007–11
 Niclas Wallin, 2011–12
 Chris Abbott, 2012–15
 Johan Harju, 2015–2017
 Niklas Olausson, 2017–2018
 Erik Gustafsson, 2018–present

Honored members

Franchise records and leaders

Regular season
Most goals in a season: Lars-Gunnar Pettersson, 30 (1990–91)
Most assists in a season: Stefan Nilsson, 40 (1991–92)
Most points in a season: Linus Klasen, 57 (2013–14)
Most points in a season, defenseman: Timo Jutila, 37 (1991–92)

Most shutouts in a season: Jarmo Myllys, 6 (1995–96, 1999–00) Anders Nilsson, 6 (2010–11) Johan Gustafsson, 6 (2011–12)
Most penalty minutes in a career: Thomas Berglund, 1083

Scoring leaders
These are the top-ten point-scorers of Luleå HF since the 1984–85 season, which was their first Elitserien season. Figures are updated after each completed season.

Note: Pos = Position; GP = Games played; G = Goals; A = Assists; Pts = Points; P/G = Points per game;  = current  Luleå HF player

Trophies and awards

Team
Le Mat Trophy (1): 1996
Champions Hockey League (1): 2014–15
European Trophy (1): 2012
Tampere cup (1): 1995

Individual

Guldhjälmen
 Jarmo Myllys: 1996–97

Guldpucken
 Mikael Renberg: 2000–01

Håkan Loob Trophy
 Lars-Gunnar Pettersson: 1998–99

Honken Trophy
 Joel Lassinantti: 2014–15

Salming Trophy
 Erik Gustafsson: 2018–19

Rookie of the Year
 Jan Mertzig: 1995–96

References

External links

 Luleå HF official homepage

Swedish Hockey League teams
Ice hockey teams in Sweden
Ice hockey clubs established in 1977
Sport in Luleå
1977 establishments in Sweden
Ice hockey teams in Norrbotten County